Qeshm Air (Hevapeimayi-ye Qeshm) is an Iranian airline; it has its headquarters in Tehran, Iran and operates scheduled domestic and international passenger services as well as charter flights. The airline was founded in 1993 as Faraz Qeshm Airline.

Qeshm Air is different with Fars Air Qeshm.

History
Qeshm Air was founded in 1993 and established its services by leasing airplanes from other airlines. The company's first routes were from Tehran to Qeshm, and from Tehran to Dubai. By  the year 2000, Qeshm Air had seven aircraft in its fleet.

Destinations

Fleet

Current fleet
As of October 2021, the Qeshm Air fleet consisted of the following aircraft:

Former fleet
Qeshm Airlines formerly operated these aircraft:
 Airbus A300B4
 Airbus A319-100
 Airbus A321-100
 Fokker 50 
 McDonnell Douglas MD-83
 Tupolev Tu-154M
 Yakovlev Yak-40
 Yakovlev Yak-42D

Accidents and incidents

 On 17 May 2001, a Faraz Qeshm Airlines Yakovlev Yak-40 departed from Tehran on a flight to Gorgan Airport carrying 30 people; including the Iranian Transport Minister Rahman Dadman, two deputy ministers and seven more members of parliament. It was forced to divert due to bad weather conditions and was later discovered crashed in the Alborz mountains, near Sari, Iran. All on board perished.

References

External links

Airlines of Iran
Airlines established in 1993
Iranian brands
Iranian companies established in 1993